"Sugar" Ray Seales, (born September 4, 1952) is an American former boxer. He was the only American boxer to win a gold medal in the 1972 Summer Olympics. As a professional, he fought middleweight champion Marvin Hagler three times. He is also the former NABF and USBA middleweight champion.

Family and early life
Seales was born in the U.S. Virgin Islands, where his father, who boxed in the U.S. Army, was stationed. The Seales family moved to Tacoma, Washington in 1965. He is the half-brother of boxer Dale Grant and the brother of boxer Wilbur Seales.

Career

Seales was a product of the Tacoma Boys Club amateur boxing program, and was coached by Joe Clough.

Amateur record: 338–12
1972 Olympic gold medalist (139 lbs.)
1971 National AAU light welterweight champion
1972 National Golden Gloves 139 pounds champion, defeating Donnie Nelson of Lowell, MA in the final

1972 Olympic results
Round of 32: defeated  Ulrich Beyer (East Germany) on points
Round of 16: defeated Jim Montague (Ireland) on points
Quarterfinal: defeated Andres Molina (Cuba) 3–2
Semifinal: defeated Zvonimir Vujin (Yugoslavia) 5–0
Final: defeated Angel Angelov (Bulgaria) 3–2

Pros
Seales was a contender for the middleweight title during the late '70s and early '80s, winning the regional level USBA and NABF titles in the process.  In his two most memorable fights, he lost a narrow decision to future middleweight champion Marvin Hagler in July 1974, then drew with Hagler in a rematch three months later.  After losing to European champion Alan Minter in 1976, Seales remained on the outskirts of contention, until a first-round technical knockout at the hands of Hagler effectively ended his title hopes.

Retirement
In 1980, Seales injured his left eye in a fight with Jaime Thomas, and retired due to a serious retinal tear.  He was subsequently declared legally blind, and was used as a cause célèbre along with Sugar Ray Leonard during the 1980s for those pushing for a ban on boxing.

Life after boxing
Years later, doctors operated and restored Seales' vision in his right eye, though he wears glasses. Seales later worked as a schoolteacher of autistic students at Lincoln High School in Tacoma for 17 years, retiring in 2004. In 2006, he moved to Indianapolis with his wife, and currently teaches at Indy Boxing and Grappling.

Honors
Seales was a 2005 inductee into the Tacoma-Pierce County Sports Hall of Fame.

On May 5, 2018, Seales was inducted to the Indiana Boxing Hall of Fame in their inaugural class.

Professional boxing record

References

External links

|-

|-

|-

Living people
1952 births
African-American boxers
Boxers at the 1972 Summer Olympics
Olympic boxers of the United States
Olympic gold medalists for the United States in boxing
Middleweight boxers
Winners of the United States Championship for amateur boxers
People from Saint Croix, U.S. Virgin Islands
Sportspeople from Tacoma, Washington
Boxers from Washington (state)
Medalists at the 1972 Summer Olympics
American male boxers
Sportspeople with a vision impairment
21st-century African-American people
20th-century African-American sportspeople